Yevdokimtsevo is a rural locality (a village) in Petushinskoye Rural Settlement, Petushinsky District, Vladimir Oblast, Russia. The population was 7 as of 2010. There are 2 streets.

Geography 
Yevdokimtsevo is located 14 km north of Petushki (the district's administrative centre) by road. Ilyinki is the nearest rural locality.

References 

Rural localities in Petushinsky District